The Deutscher Computerspielpreis (DCP, German Video Game Awards) is a prize for the German games industry and has been awarded since 2009. The DCP is awarded by the Federal Republic of Germany, represented by the Ministry of State for Digitalisation and the Federal Ministry of Transport and Digital Infrastructure, and game – the German Games Industry Association.

Description 

The Deutscher Computerspielpreis (The German Video Game Awards) was first awarded in 2009. The venue for the German Video Game Awards ceremony alternates annually between Munich and Berlin. The German Video Game Awards are presented by the Federal Ministry of Transport and Digital Infrastructure and game – the German Games Industry Association, with the support of the Digital Gaming Culture Foundation. The prize money is donated by those supporters and amounts to a total of €790,000 in 2021. The German Video Game Awards are the most prestigious games award within Germany. Awarded are games of "cultural and pedagogical value", technical or gameplay-related innovations or games of high entertainment value. Prize money is only disbursed to winners in national categories. Basic condition to submit a game in one of the donated categories is a development quota of 80 percent of the game in Germany.

In 2015, the award was fundamentally reshaped. Besides the introduction of new and the re-structuring of existing categories, criteria for registration have been reformulated. The award consists of 15 categories including a "Special Jury Award" and the category "Player of the Year" elected by the community. The international award categories and the category "Player of the Year" are exempt from donation.

The German Video Game Awards are announced (tendered) jointly by politicians and industry and were created by the German Government following an initiative of the German Bundestag (German Parliament) in cooperation with the former game associations BIU (German Trade Association of Interactive Entertainment Software) and GAME (German Games Industry Association) trade associations. 
Documents concerning the origin of the award are the Report of BKM to the German Bundestag dated 24. October 2007 (federal printed matter: BT-Drs. 16/7081) and the resolution of the German Bundestag dating 21. February 2008 following a proposal of the grand coalition of the SPD Party and the CDU Party (printed matter: BT-Drs. 16/7116). Background of the initiative was the perceived change of importance within society regardless of age, sex and social background of gamers and the increase of games industry as an economy of scale, as well as the extended application of games and game technology in other sectors of economy. 
Until 2014 the Kulturstaatsministerium (State Ministry of Culture) was the political Partner complementary to BIU and GAME as the economical partners of the German Video Game Awards. In 2014 the Ministry of Transport and digital Infrastructure adopted the role of the political partner.

Primary purpose is the promotion of the German games industry. Especially the development of innovative cultural and pedagogical valuable games is emphasized. Complementing its role as an advancement award, the German Video Game Awards  also award donated prizes to game concepts from students within a particular category “Best debut” and “Best prototype” therefore support non-professionals financially to realize their ideas for video games.

Awarded games

2009 
 Best German Game and Best Youth Game: Drakensang: The Dark Eye
 Best Children's Game: Fritz and Chesster
 Best Browser game: Ikariam
 Best mobile Game: Crazy Machines
 Best Serious game: TechForce
 Best international Game:
 Wii Fit
 LittleBigPlanet
 Best pupil's Game: Monkey´s World Wide Jungle (Elsa-Brändström-Gymnasium, Oberhausen)
 Best student's Game: Snatch'em (Hochschule für Technik und Wirtschaft Berlin)

2010 
 Best German Game and Best International Game: Anno 1404
 Best Children's Game: Lernerfolg Vorschule – Capt´n Sharky
 Best Youth Game: The Whispered World
 Best Browser Game: Wewaii
 Best Mobile Game: Giana Sisters DS
 Best Serious Game: ExperiMINTe
 Best Pupil's Game: GooseGogs (Frederic Schimmelpfennig, Nikolaus-August-Otto-Schule, Bad Schwalbach)
 Best Student's Game: Night of Joeanne (Mediadesign Hochschule, Düsseldorf)

2011 
 Best German Game and Best Youth Game: A New Beginning
 Best Children's Game: The Kore Gang
 Best Browser Game: The Settlers Online
 Best mobile Game: Galaxy on Fire 2
 Best "Serious Game": Energetika
 Best concept of the young talents competition: Tiny & Big in Grandpa's Leftovers

2012 
 Best German Game Crysis 2
 Best Youth Game: Edna & Harvey: Harvey’s New Eyes
 Best Children's Game: The Great Jitters: Pudding Panic
 Best Browser Game: Drakensang Online
 Best mobile Game: Das verrückte Labyrinth HD
 Best "Serious Game": Vom Fehlenden Fisch – Die Geheimnisvolle Welt der Gemälde
 Best Concept of the Young Talents Competition: About Love, Hate and Other Ones
 Special Award Browser Game: Trauma
 Special Award of the Young Talents Competition: Pan it!

2013 
 Best German Game Chaos on Deponia
 Best Youth Game: Tiny & Big in Grandpa's Leftovers
 Best Children's Game: Meine 1. App – Band 1 Fahrzeuge 
 Best Browser Game: Forge of Empires
 Best Mobile Game: Word Wonders: The Tower of Babel
 Best "Serious Game": Menschen auf der Flucht
 Best Concept of the Young Talents Competition: GroundPlay

2014 
 Best German Game The Inner World
 Best Youth Game: Beatbuddy: Tale of the Guardians
 Best Children's Game: Malduell
 Best Browser Game: Anno Online
 Best Mobile Game: CLARC
 Best Concept of the Young Talents Competition: Scherbenwerk – Bruchteil einer Ewigkeit
 Special award: The Day the Laughter Stopped

2015 
The awards were announced  on April 21, 2015 in Berlin.

 Best German Game: Lords of the Fallen (Deck13, CI Games)
 Best Children's Game: Fire (Daedalic Entertainment)
 Best Youth Game: TRI: Of Friendship and Madness (Rat King Entertainment, Rising Star Games)
 Best Concept of the Young Talents Competition: In Between
 Best Innovation: Spiel des Friedens (Studio Fizbin, Landesmuseum für Kunst und Kultur Münster)
 Best Staging: Lords of the Fallen (Deck13, CI Games)
 Best Serious Game: Utopolis – Aufbruch der Tiere (Reality Twist, Nemetschek Stiftung)
 Best Mobile Game: Rules! (The Coding Monkeys)
 Best Game Design: The Last Tinker: City of Colors (Mimimi Productions)
 Best International Game: This War of Mine (11 bit studios)
 Best International Multiplayer Game: Hearthstone: Heroes of Warcraft (Blizzard Entertainment)
 Best International New Game World: This War of Mine (11 bit studios)
 Audience Award: Dark Souls II (From Software, Bandai Namco)

2016 
The awards were announced on April 7, 2016 in Munich.

 Best German game: Anno 2205 (Blue Byte/Ubisoft)
 Best Concept of the Young Talents Competition: 1. Cubiverse (Mediadesign Hochschule Munich), 2. Lost Ember (HAW Hamburg, Mooneye Studios), 3. Leaves (TU Cologne)
 Best Children's Game: 1. Fiete Choice (Ahoiii Entertainment); 2. Shift Happens (Klonk)
 Best Youth Game: One Button Travel (The Coding Monkeys)
 Best Innovation: The Climb (Crytek)
 Best Staging: Typoman (Brainseed Factory, Headup Games)
 Best Serious Game: Professor S. (LudInc, Berlin)
 Best Mobile Game: Path of War (Envision Entertainment, Nexon)
 Best Game Design: Shift Happens (Klonk)
 Best International Game: The Witcher 3: Wild Hunt (CD Projekt RED, Bandai Namco)
 Best International Multiplayer Game: Splatoon (Nintendo)
 Best International New Game World: The Witcher 3: Wild Hunt (CD Projekt Red, Bandai Namco)
 Special Jury Award: Indie Arena Booth
 Audience Award: The Witcher 3: Wild Hunt (CD Projekt Red, Bandai Namco)

2017 
The awards were announced on April 26, 2017 in Berlin.

 Best German game: Portal Knights (Keen Games/505 Games)
 Best Concept of the Young Talents Competition: 1. DYO (HTW Berlin), 2. Isometric Epilepsy (Technical University of Cologne, North Rhine-Westphalia), 3. ViSP – Virtual Space Port (HTW Berlin)
 Best Children's Game: She Remembered Caterpillars (Jumpsuit Entertainment, Kassel/Ysbyrd Games, Brighton)
 Best Youth Game: Code 7 – Episode 0: Allocation (Goodwolf Studio, Bonn)
 Best Innovation: VR Coaster Rides and Coastiality App (VR Coaster, Kaiserslautern)
 Best Staging: Robinson: The Journey (Crytek, Frankfurt)
 Best Serious Game (two winners): Debugger 3.16: Hack’n’Run (Spiderwork Games, Vechta), Orwell (Osmotic Studios, Hamburg/Surprise Attack, Melbourne)
 Best Mobile Game: Glitchskier (Shelly Alon, Hamburg)
 Best Game Design: Shadow Tactics: Blades of the Shogun (Mimimi Productions , Munich/Daedalic Entertainment, Hamburg)
 Best International Game: The Legend of Zelda: Breath of the Wild (Nintendo, Kyoto/Japan)
 Best International Multiplayer Game: Overwatch (video game) (Activision Blizzard, Santa Monica, California/United States)
 Best International New Game World: Uncharted 4: A Thief's End (Naughty Dog/Sony Interactive Entertainment, Santa Monica, California)
 Special Jury Award: Computerspielemuseum Berlin (Berlin)
 Audience Award: The Witcher 3: Wild Hunt – Blood and Wine (CD Projekt, Warsaw/Poland)

2018 
The awards were announced on April  10, 2018 in Munich.

 Best German game: Witch It (Barrel Roll Games, Hamburg)
 Best Children's Game: Monkey Swag (Tiny Crocodile Studios/kunst-stoff, Berlin)
 Best Youth Game: Witch It (Barrel Roll Games, Hamburg)
 Best Innovation: HUXLEY (Exit Adventures, Kaiserslautern)
 Best Staging: The Long Journey Home (Daedalic Entertainment, Düsseldorf)
 Best Serious Game: Vocabicar (Quantum Frog, Oldenburg)
 Best Mobile Game: Card Thief (Arnold Rauers,  Berlin)
 Best Game Design: TownsmenVR (HandyGames, Giebelstadt)
 Best International Game: Assassin's Creed Origins (Ubisoft)
 Best International Multiplayer Game: Witch It (Barrel Roll Games, Hamburg)
 Best International Game World: Horizon Zero Dawn (Guerrilla Games/Sony Interactive Entertainment)
 Young Talent with Concept: 1. Ernas Unheil (HTW Berlin), 2. Sunset Devils (Carl-Hofer-Schule, Karlsruhe)
 Young Talent with Prototype: 1. Fading Skies (HAW Hamburg), 2. Realm of the Machines (Mediadesign Hochschule, München)
 Special Jury Award: Friendly Fire (charity campaign)
 Audience Award: ELEX (Piranha Bytes, Essen)

2019 
The awards were announced on April  9, 2019 in Munich.

 Best German game: Trüberbrook (Headup Games)
 Best Children's Game: Laika (Mad About Pandas)
 Best Youth Game: Unforeseen Incidents (Application Systems Heidelberg)
 Best Innovation: Bcon – The Gaming Wearable (CapLab)
 Best Staging: Trüberbrook (Headup Games)
 Best Serious Game: State of Mind (Daedalic Entertainment)
 Best Mobile Game: see/saw (kamibox)
 Best Game Design: Tower Tag (VR Nerds)
 Best International Game: God of War (Sony Interactive Entertainment)
 Best International Multiplayer Game: Super Smash Bros. Ultimate (Nintendo)
 Best International Game World: Red Dead Redemption 2 (Rockstar Games)
 Young Talent with Concept: Elizabeth (HTW Berlin)
 Young Talent with Prototype: A Juggler’s Tale (Film Academy Baden-Württemberg)
 Special Jury Award: A Maze. / Berlin (International Games and Playful Media Festival)
 Audience Award: Thronebreaker: The Witcher Tales (CD Projekt Red)

2020 

 Best German Game: Anno 1800 (Ubisoft Mainz/Ubisoft)
 Best Family Game: Tilt Pack (Navel/Super.com)
 Young Talent - Best Debut: The Longing (Studio Seufz/Application Systems Heidelberg)
 Young Talent - Best Prototype: Couch Monsters (Laurin Grossmann, John Kees, Marie Maslofski, Dennis Oprisa, Luca Storz, Jaqueline Vintonjek – HTW Berlin)
 Best Innovation and Technology: Lonely Mountains: Downhill (Megagon Industries/Thunderful Publishing)
 Best Games World and Aesthetics: Sea of Solitude (Jo-Mei/Electronic Arts)
 Best Game Design: Anno 1800 (Ubisoft Mainz/Ubisoft)
 Best Serious Game: Through the Darkest of Times (Paintbucket Games/HandyGames)
 Best Mobile Game: Song of Bloom (Kamibox)
 Best Expert Game: Avorion (Boxelware)
 Best International Game: Star Wars Jedi: Fallen Order (Electronic Arts)
 Best International Multiplayer Game: Apex Legends (Electronic Arts)
 Player of the Year: gob b (Fatih Dayik)
 Best Studio: Yager Development (Berlin)
 Special Jury Award: Foldit
 Audience Award: The Witcher 3: Wild Hunt for Nintendo Switch (CD Projekt RED / Bandai Namco)

2021 

 Best German Game: Desperados III (Mimimi Games/THQ Nordic)
 Best Family Game: El Hijo – A Wild West Tale (Honig Studios, Quantumfrog/HandyGames – a THQ Nordic Division)
 Young Talent - Best Debut: Dorfromantik (Toukana Interactive)
 Young Talent - Best Prototype: Passing By (Hannah Kümmel, Jan Milosch, Marius Mühleck, Ilona Treml)
 Best Innovation and Technology: Holoride (Holoride)
 Best Games World and Aesthetics: Cloudpunk (ION Lands)
 Best Game Design: Dorfromantik (Toukana Interactive)
 Best Serious Game: Welten der Werkstoffe (Cologne Game Lab der TH Köln) 
 Best Mobile Game: Polarized! (Marcel-André Casasola Merkle/TheCodingMonkeys)
 Best Expert Game: Suzerain (Torpor Games/Fellow Traveller)
 Best International Game: The Last of Us Part II (Naughty Dog/Sony Interactive Entertainment)
 Best International Multiplayer Game: Animal Crossing: New Horizons (Nintendo)
 Player of the Year: Gnu (Jasmin K.)
 Best Studio: Mimimi Games (Munich)
 Special Jury Award: Indie Arena Booth Online 2020 (Super Crowd Entertainment)

References

External links 
 

2009 establishments in Germany
Awards established in 2009
German awards
Video game awards
Video gaming in Germany